Neilus Flynn was a hurler who played hurling with Causeway in Co Kerry. He was the club's first Kerry Senior Hurling Championship-winning captain in 1932.  He had the honour of captaining two different teams to Championship success; Causeway in 1932, and St Brendan's in 1936. He also captained a Shannon Rovers amalgamation in the 1939 County Final defeat to Crotta.

The inscription on the cup reads:

CORN NEILUS Ó FLOINN CRAOBH IOMÁINT

SINSIR CONTAE CHIARRAÍ

BRONNAITHE AG MUINTIR UÍ FHOINN

AN TÓCHAR AR CHOISTE CHIARRAÍ C.L.G

I GCUIMHE A NATHAIR NEILUS

MEAN FHÓIR 1987.

External links
 Page about Corn Neilus Uí Fhloinn

Causeway hurlers
St Brendan's hurlers
Kerry inter-county hurlers
Year of birth missing
Year of death missing